Leda and the Swan is a story and subject in art from Greek mythology in which the god Zeus, in the form of a swan, seduces and has sex with Leda. According to later Greek mythology, Leda bore Helen and Polydeuces, children of Zeus, while at the same time bearing Castor and Clytemnestra, children of her husband Tyndareus, the King of Sparta. According to many versions of the story, Zeus took the form of a swan and had sexual intercourse with Leda on the same night she slept with her husband King Tyndareus. In some versions, she laid two eggs from which the children hatched. In other versions, Helen is a daughter of Nemesis, the goddess who personified the disaster that awaited those suffering from the pride of Hubris.

Especially in art, the degree of consent by Leda to the relationship seems to vary considerably; there are numerous depictions, for example by Leonardo da Vinci, that show Leda affectionately embracing the swan, as their children play.

The subject was rarely seen in the large-scale sculpture of antiquity, although a representation of Leda in sculpture has been attributed in modern times to Timotheus (compare illustration, below left); small-scale sculptures survive showing both reclining and standing poses, in cameos and engraved gems, rings, and terracotta oil lamps. Thanks to the literary renditions of Ovid and Fulgentius it was a well-known myth through the Middle Ages, but emerged more prominently as a classicizing theme, with erotic overtones, in the Italian Renaissance.

Eroticism

The subject undoubtedly owed its sixteenth-century popularity to the paradox that it was considered more acceptable to depict a woman in the act of copulation with a swan than with a man.  The earliest depictions show the pair love-making with some explicitness—more so than in any depictions of a human pair made by artists of high quality in the same period.
The fate of the erotic album I Modi some years later shows why this was so. The theme remained a dangerous one in the Renaissance, as the fates of the three best known paintings on the subject demonstrate.  The earliest depictions were all in the more private medium of the old master print, and mostly from Venice.  They were often based on the extremely brief account in the Metamorphoses of Ovid (who does not imply a rape), though Lorenzo de' Medici had both a Roman sarcophagus and an antique carved gem of the subject, both with reclining Ledas.

The earliest known explicit Renaissance depiction is one of the many woodcut illustrations to Hypnerotomachia Poliphili, a book published in Venice in 1499.  This shows Leda and the Swan making love with gusto, despite being on top of a triumphal car, being pulled along and surrounded by a considerable crowd. An engraving dating to 1503 at the latest, by Giovanni Battista Palumba, also shows the couple in coitus, but in deserted countryside. Another engraving, certainly from Venice and attributed by many to Giulio Campagnola, shows a love-making scene, but there Leda's attitude is highly ambiguous. Palumba made another engraving, perhaps in about 1512, presumably influenced by Leonardo's sketches for his earlier composition, showing Leda seated on the ground and playing with her children.

There were also significant depictions in the smaller decorative arts, also private media. Benvenuto Cellini made a medallion, now in Vienna, early in his career, and Antonio Abondio one on the obverse of a medal celebrating a Roman courtesan.

In painting

Leonardo da Vinci began making studies in 1504 for a painting, apparently never executed, of Leda seated on the ground with her children. In 1508 he painted a different composition of the subject, with a nude standing Leda cuddling the Swan, with the two sets of infant twins (also nude), and their huge broken egg-shells. The original of this is lost, probably deliberately destroyed, and was last recorded in the French royal Château de Fontainebleau in 1625 by Cassiano dal Pozzo.  However it is known from many copies, of which the earliest are probably the Spiridon Leda, perhaps by a studio assistant and now in the Uffizi, and the one at Wilton House in the United Kingdom (illustrated).

Also lost, and probably deliberately destroyed, is Michelangelo's tempera painting of the pair making love, commissioned in 1529 by Alfonso d'Este for his palazzo in Ferrara, and taken to France for the royal collection in 1532; it was at Fontainebleau in 1536. Michelangelo's cartoon for the work—given to his assistant Antonio Mini, who used it for several copies for French patrons before his death in 1533—survived for over a century.  This composition is known from many copies, including an ambitious engraving by Cornelis Bos, c. 1563; the marble sculpture by Bartolomeo Ammanati in the Bargello, Florence; two copies by the young Rubens on his Italian voyage, and the painting after Michelangelo, ca. 1530, in the National Gallery, London. The Michelangelo composition, of about 1530, shows Mannerist tendencies of elongation and twisted pose (the figura serpentinata) that were popular at the time. In addition, a sculptural group, similar to the Prado Roman group illustrated, was believed until at least the 19th century to be by Michelangelo.

The last very famous Renaissance painting of the subject is Correggio's elaborate composition of c. 1530 (Berlin); this too was damaged whilst in the collection of Philippe II, Duke of Orléans, the Regent of France in the minority of Louis XV.  His son Louis, though a great lover of painting, had periodic crises of conscience about his way of life, in one of which he attacked the figure of Leda with a knife. The damage has been repaired, though full restoration to the original condition was not possible.  Both the Leonardo and Michelangelo paintings also disappeared when in the collection of the French Royal Family, and are believed to have been destroyed by more moralistic widows or successors of their owners.

There were many other depictions in the Renaissance, including cycles of book illustrations to Ovid, but most were derivative of the compositions mentioned above. The subject remained largely confined to Italy, and sometimes France – Northern versions are rare. After something of a hiatus in the 18th and early 19th centuries (apart from a very sensuous Boucher,), Leda and the Swan became again a popular motif in the later 19th and 20th centuries, with many Symbolist and Expressionist treatments.

Also from that era were sculptures of the theme by Antonin Mercié and Max Klinger.

In modern and contemporary art
Cy Twombly executed an abstract version of Leda and the Swan in 1962. It was purchased by Larry Gagosian for $52.9 million at Christie's May 2017 Post-War and Contemporary Art Evening Sale.

Avant-garde filmmaker Kurt Kren along with other members of the Viennese Actionist movement, including Otto Muehl and Hermann Nitsch, made a film-performance called 7/64 Leda und der Schwan in 1964. The film retains the classical motif, portraying, for most of its duration, a young woman embracing a swan.

There is a life-sized marble statue of Leda and the Swan at the Jai Vilas Palace Museum in Gwalior, Northern Madhya Pradesh, India.

American artist and photographer Carole Harmel created the "Bird" series (1983), a Jean Cocteau-influenced collection of photographs that explored the "Leda and the Swan" myth in tightly cropped, voyeuristic images of a nude female and an undefinable birdlike creature hinting at intimacy.

Bristol Museum and Art Gallery currently exhibits Karl Weschke's Leda and the Swan, painted in 1986.  The Winnipeg Art Gallery in Canada has, in its permanent collection, a ceramic "Leda and the Swan" by Japanese-born American artist Akio Takamori. Genieve Figgis painted her version of Leda and the Swan in 2018 after an earlier work by François Boucher. Figgis’ contemporary version reinvents the idyllic romantic scene of lavish playfulness with a dark humor creating a scene of profanity and horror. There is a sculpture in neon lights depicting Leda and the Swan in Berlin, near Sonnenallee metro station and the Estrel hotel, designed by AES+F.  Photographer Charlie White included a portrait of Leda in his "And Jeopardize the Integrity of the Hull" series. Zeus, as the swan, only appears metaphorically.

A statue of an egg depicting the union of Swan/Zeus with Leda, is placed on the island Pefnos of Agios Dimitrios village, in the region of Messenia on the coast of the southern Peloponnese peninsula in Greece.

In poetry
Ronsard wrote a poem on La Défloration de Lède, perhaps inspired by the Michelangelo, which he may well have known. He imagines the beak going into Leda's mouth.

"Leda and the Swan" is a sonnet by William Butler Yeats composed in 1923 and first published in the Dial in June, 1924, and later published in the collection 'The Cat the Moon and Certain Poems' in 1924.  Combining psychological realism with a mystic vision, it describes the swan's rape of Leda. It also alludes to the Trojan war, which will be provoked by the abduction of Helen, who will be begotten by Zeus on Leda (along with Castor and Pollux, in some versions of the myth). Clytaemnestra, who killed her husband, Agamemnon, leader of the Greeks at Troy, was also supposed to have hatched from one of Leda's eggs. The poem is regularly praised as one of Yeats's masterpieces. Camille Paglia, who called the poem "the greatest poem of the twentieth century," and said "all human beings, like Leda, are caught up moment by moment in the 'white rush' of experience. For Yeats, the only salvation is the shapeliness and stillness of art."  See external links for a bas relief arranged in the position as described by Yeats.

Nicaraguan poet Rubén Darío's 1892 poem "Leda" contains an oblique description of the rape, watched over by the god Pan.

H.D. (Hilda Doolittle) also wrote a poem called "Leda" in 1919, suggested to be from the perspective of Leda. The description of the sexual action going on makes it seem almost beautiful, as if Leda had given her consent.

In the song "Power and Glory" from Lou Reed's 1992 album Magic and Loss, Reed recalls the experience of seeing his friend dying of cancer and makes reference to the myth, "I saw isotopes introduced into his lungs / trying to stop the cancerous spread / And it made me think of Leda and The Swan / and gold being made from lead"

Sylvia Plath alludes to the myth in her radio play Three Women written for the BBC in 1962. The play features the voices of three women. The first is a married woman who keeps her baby. The second is a secretary who suffers a miscarriage. The third voice, a girl who is pregnant and leaves her baby, mentions "the great swan, with its terrible look,/ Coming at me," insinuating that the girl was raped. The play is about the disconnection of women in society and challenges societal expectations of childbirth.

In literature
Several references to the myth are presented in novels by Angela Carter, including Nights at the Circus and The Magic Toyshop. In the latter novel, the myth is brought to life in the form of a performance in which a frightened young girl is forced to act as Leda in accompaniment with a large mechanical swan.

The myth is also mentioned in Richard Yates' 1962 novel Revolutionary Road. The character Frank Wheeler, married to April Wheeler, after having had sex with an office secretary ponders what to say as he is leaving: "Did the swan apologize to Leda? Did an eagle apologize? Did a lion apologize? Hell no!"

In Robert Galbraith's 2020 novel, Troubled Blood, one of the main characters Robin Ellacott, visits a painting gallery where she sees a painting of Leda and the swan done by one character who is an artist in the novel.

In fashion
In 1935, German-born movie star Marlene Dietrich wore a dramatically designed Leda costume to a Hollywood costume party. Designed by the acclaimed costume designer Travis Banton, a longtime Dietrich collaborator, the white tulle and feather dress featured a thigh-slit, a mid-length train and, most characteristically, a fabric and feather "swan" neck which coiled around Dietrich's own neck, as well a pair of large feathered wings, one stretching downwards across her chest and the other one upwards across her left shoulder.

66 years later, at the 2001 Academy Awards, Icelandic singer Björk wore a dress by Marjan Pejoski in nude mesh and a white tulle skirt. The skirt gradually narrowed upwards over the torso to turn into a swan-neck made out of fabric which coiled around the wearer's neck in exactly the same way as Dietrich's dress from 1935. Although Dietrich's costume remains largely unknown to the general public, Björk's dress "attained cult status instantly" and became an icon of red carpet culture. Yet, the reference to Marlene Dietrich's costume was rarely (if ever) mentioned at the time.

In June 2021, Maria Grazia Chiuri as creative director for the French fashion house Dior, designed a collection strongly inspired by Hellenistic culture, the Olympic Games, and Ancient Greek Mythology, and showed it at the Panathenaic Stadium in Athens as an homage to the Olympic tradition (the collection was shown a month before the beginning of the 2020 Summer Olympics). The collection's closing pièce de résistance was a Leda-inspired swan dress. The immediate visual similarity between Chiuri's swan Dress and Björk's swan dress sparked excitement on social media as most people inevitably thought the Dior dress was directly inspired by Pejoski's iconic 2001 creation. However, only a few days later, Dior openly defended the inspiration of the dress referring to it on its Twitter account as a recreation of a costume worn by Marlene Dietrich, who was, famously, an important and loyal client of the French brand during the 40s and 50s. Notably, Chiuri's 2021 Dior dress featured feathered swan-wings spanning over the chest and shoulder. This dramatic detail, taken directly from Dietrich's costume from 1935, sets Chiuri's dress for Dior entirely apart from Björk's red-carpet dress, and makes it, irrefutably, a reference to Dietrich's costume, and by extension, to the myth of Leda and the Swan.

In modern media
A version of the Leda and the Swan story is the foundation myth in the Canadian futuristic thriller television series Orphan Black which aired over 5 seasons from 2013 to 2017. A corporation uses genetic engineering to create a series of female clones (Leda) and a series of male clones (Castor) who are also brothers and sisters clones as they derive from one mother who is a chimera with male and female genomes.

Musical artist Hozier released the single Swan Upon Leda in 2022, referencing the myth as a tool to advocate for reproductive rights.

In commerce 
The Philadelphia cigar maker 'Bobrow Brothers' made a brand of cigars with the name 'Leda' which was sold at least into the 1940s. The cigar label depicted Leda and the Swan in a river.

Modern censorship
In April 2012 an art gallery in London, England, was instructed by the police to remove a modern exhibit of Leda and the Swan. The law concerned was Section 63 of the Criminal Justice and Immigration Act 2008, condemning 'violent pornography', brought in by the Labour Party government of 2005–2010.

Gallery

Notes

References
Bull, Malcolm, The Mirror of the Gods, How Renaissance Artists Rediscovered the Pagan Gods, Oxford UP, 2005,

Further reading

External links

 Version of Leda and the Swan myth, in the "Fabulae" of Hyginus
Bas relief from the British Museum that appears as the scene does in the Yeats sonnet
Ovid Illustrated – large site from the University of Virginia, where many depictions of Leda and the Swan from Renaissance and later editions of the Metamorphoses will (eventually) be found.
Yeats' "Leda and the Swan": an image's coming of age
Greek vase from the Getty
Samuelson blog with thoughts and pictures
16th century Venetian painting by Il Padovanino
Alternative detail view of the Getty vase
Roman statue from the Getty
Baroque bronze from the Getty
Sculpture c 1900
Leda and the swan – Bronze miniature
Leda and the Swan, by Tintoretto, from the Galleria degli Uffizi, Florence; explore other depictions of Leda and the Swan and compare to similar themes
 
Jai Vilas Palace Museum, Gwalior, India

Irish poems
1924 poems
Greek mythology
Iconography
Swans
Mythological rape victims
Zoophilia in culture